2,4-Dimethoxybenzaldehyde (DMBA) is a reagent used to specifically quantify phlorotannins. This product  reacts specifically with 1,3-and 1,3,5-substituted phenols (e.g., phlorotannins) to form a colored product.

References 

Benzaldehydes